The Ford E-Series (also known as the Ford Econoline, Ford Econovan or Ford Club Wagon) is a range of full-size vans manufactured and marketed by the Ford Motor Company. Introduced for model year 1961 as the replacement for the Ford F-Series panel van, the E-Series line is currently in its fourth generation.

Produced in multiple design variations for both retail and commercial sale, the E-Series was developed as a van for either cargo or passenger use, and as a cutaway van chassis and stripped chassis (a chassis without bodywork). Since the 2015 model year, only the latter two designs are offered, as Ford replaced E-Series vans with the Ford Transit. From 1980 to 2014, the E-Series van was the best-selling full-sized van in the United States.

The model line entered its 60th year of production for 2021, thus being one of Ford's longest running model lines, second only to the Ford F-Series (in production since 1948) within Ford Motor Company. The E-Series is assembled by Ford at its Ohio Assembly facility at Avon Lake, Ohio, which has produced the model line since 1975. Prior to its closure, Lorain Assembly in Lorain, Ohio, assembled the model line from 1961 to 2005.

First generation (1961–1967) 

Ford released the first-generation Ford Econoline on September 21, 1960, for the 1961 model year. Beginning development in 1957, the model line served as a replacement for the Ford F-Series panel delivery (and the smaller Ford Courier sedan delivery). Three models were available, a cargo van, a passenger van (also sold under the Station Bus and Club Wagon names), and a forward-control pickup truck.

Competing directly against the rear-engined Chevrolet Corvair van and Volkswagen Transporter, the Ford Econoline established multiple design precedents adopted by successive American vans, including the Chevrolet Van and Dodge A100. While also a forward-control vehicle, Ford introduced a midengined configuration. To improve cargo access by creating a flat load floor and enlarging the rear doors, the engine was placed between the front seats.

Chassis 
The first-generation Ford Econoline was based on the Ford Falcon compact car range. To accommodate its 90-inch wheelbase (the shortest for a Ford since 1908), the Econoline adopted a midengined configuration, placing the engine behind the front axle; consequently, the layout precluded the use of a V8 engine.

The Econoline was initially powered by the  144-cubic-inch inline-six (the standard engine of the Falcon); a  170-cubic-inch inline-six was introduced as an option. For 1965, the 170 six became standard, with a 240 cubic-inch six introduced as an option. A three-speed manual was standard, with a Dagenham four-speed manual introduced for 1963 and discontinued in 1964; the 170-cubic-inch engine was offered with a three-speed automatic in 1964, and the larger two engines were both offered with a three-speed automatic as an option thereafter.

In contrast to the Falcon, the Econoline was fitted with a solid front axle and a solid rear axle suspension with leaf springs for all four wheels.

Body 
In its body design, the Ford Econoline adapted several elements of the Volkswagen Type 2, while making major departures with other design features to accommodate its mid-engined layout. In line with Volkswagen, the Econoline positioned the front seats above the front axle, making it a cabover-style configuration (similar to the Jeep Forward Control). The grille placed below the headlights was a design feature borrowed loosely from the Ford Thames 400E (a predecessor of the Ford Transit).

The midengined placement enlarged the cargo area, as the engine compartment was located forward of the flat load floor. While Volkswagen marketed rear-engined vans in the United States until 1991, Chevrolet/GMC and Dodge both adopted the design of the Econoline, introducing midengined vans for the 1964 model year.

Through its production, the first-generation Ford Econoline was offered in several variants. Alongside the standard six-door cargo van, an eight-door version (adding two doors on the driver side) was added for 1963. For 1964, a panel van was introduced, deleting side loading doors altogether. For 1965, a "Super Van" extended-length body was introduced, extending the body 18 inches behind the rear axle. Econoline cargo vans (except panel vans) were offered with or without side windows in several configurations.

Variants 
Alongside the Ford Falcon, the Ford Econoline was expanded into a product line including several vehicles. In Canada, the Econoline was marketed through both the sales networks of both Ford and Lincoln-Mercury (as a Mercury), to increase its presence outside of urban areas.

Passenger van 
Introduced alongside the cargo van in 1961, Ford introduced two passenger variants of the Econoline (branded as part of the Falcon range). Alongside the Station Bus (branded as both a Falcon and Econoline), Ford marketed the Club Wagon. While the Station Bus was largely intended for commercial/fleet use, the Club Wagon was marketed as an alternative to station wagons. A five-seat configuration was standard, with an eight-seat configuration offered as an option.

Pickup truck 

Introduced as a bodystyle for 1961, the Ford Econoline pickup truck derived its body from the cargo van. Similar in configuration to the Chevrolet Corvair pickup, the Econoline pickup bed had no engine intrusion related to the engine compartment. While far shorter than the similar-GVWR F-100, the Econoline pickup was designed with a 7-foot-long pickup bed (sized between the two F-Series offerings). Two versions of the cab were offered, a standard "three-window" cab and an optional "five-window", which added wraparound windows to the cab corners.

The introduction of the 240-cubic-inch engine for 1965 necessitated a larger engine compartment, intruding slightly into the cargo bed (to provide clearance for the transmission bellhousing). The same year, a "Spring Special" package was offered as a trim option.

At the time of its launch, Ford projected the Econoline pickup truck to outsell the van, but buyers reversed the trend, with the van outselling the pickup truck nine-to-one. The bodystyle ended production after the 1967 model year, remaining unique to the first generation.

Mercury Econoline

The first-generation Econoline was sold by Ford of Canada by both Ford and Lincoln-Mercury. When branding its truck offerings under the Mercury brand, Ford of Canada maximized its presence in rural area serviced by either Ford or Lincoln-Mercury (but not both). As with the Mercury M-series trucks, the Mercury Econoline was largely identical to its Ford namesake (differing primarily in badging); the model was marketed in Canada as a cargo and passenger van and a pickup truck.

For 1961, Ford of Canada began production Mercury-brand Econolines at Oakville Assembly in Ontario; later that year, Mercury Econoline pickup was shifted to Lorain Assembly in Ohio. For 1962, production of the entire model line returned to Oakville. After 1965, production of the model line was sourced from the United States.

Production numbers of Mercury Econolines were low; for example, 1,291 Mercury Econoline pickup trucks were built in 1965. Following the 1968 model year, Ford of Canada ended the sale of Mercury-branded trucks, leaving the Mercury Econoline as the last Mercury-branded van until the 1993 Mercury Villager minivan.

Second generation (1968–1974)

Following a lengthy United Auto Workers strike in 1967, the launch of the second-generation Econoline van was delayed almost four months, until January 1968. Instead of marketing the van as a 1968 or 1968-1/2 model, Ford marketed it for model year 1969. Losing its Falcon roots, the second-generation Econoline became a heavier-duty vehicle, sharing many of its underpinnings with the F-series full-sized pickups.

Chassis 
The unibody construction of the previous generation was carried over, and the mid-engine, forward-control layout gave way to a front-engine layout with a forward axle placement; this allowed use of the "Twin I-Beam" front suspension from the F-series trucks. The wheelbase increased , while the  longer long-wheelbase model became the largest full-sized van offered in North America at the time.

Following Dodge and Chevrolet/GMC, a V8 engine became optional.

Body 
With the change of chassis and axle configurations, the Econoline gained a conventional hood for engine access, though engine access remained largely from the van's interior. The redesign provided a conventional grille, styled similarly to the F series.

For 1971, the grille was redesigned to match the updated F series. For 1972, a sliding rear door became an option; introduced on a cutaway van chassis was the Hi-Cube van, a cab-chassis version of the Econoline with a box-van body. The introduction of the cab-chassis variant became popular in the recreational-vehicle industry (a Class C RV), a segment still dominated by the E series in the 2010s.

Interior 
Inside of the Econoline, the shift of the engine location moved the engine housing from between the seats to in front of the driver and front passenger, under the windshield. While the Econoline cargo van remained, it was joined by an Econoline passenger van (replacing the Falcon van). To attract more buyers to passenger vans, Ford introduced two new trims of the passenger van, the Ford Club Wagon and Ford Club Wagon Chateau. Based on the long-wheelbase version, the Chateau had air conditioning, houndstooth fabric on all seats, an AM/FM sound system, and the option of 12-passenger seating.

Third generation (1975–1991)

For 1975, the Econoline/Club Wagon were given a complete redesign. Based on an all-new chassis, Ford became the first American manufacturer to adapt body-on-frame construction to a full-size van.

The new-generation Econoline would become common not only in its own right, but as the basis for other vehicles. With a full frame, the Econoline became popular as a cutaway van chassis; the design served as a basis for many ambulances, and various types of trucks and buses. The shared drivetrain with the F-Series marked the beginning of aftermarket four-wheel drive conversions. During the 1970s, the Econoline became popular as a basis for van conversions. Using the sparsely-equipped Econoline cargo van as a basis, a luxurious interior was fitted, along with extensive customization of the exterior.

The 1978 Ford Econoline was MotorTrend's first-ever Truck of the Year.

Chassis 

To increase the versatility of the full-size van line, the Econoline was developed using body-on-frame construction for the first time. In addition to increasing the strength of the chassis, the configuration allowed more commonality with the F-series trucks. As before, the Twin I-Beam front suspension was used. In its new configuration, the engine was moved further forward and lowered relative to the body. After the 1984 model year, the 124-inch wheelbase Club Wagon passenger van was discontinued, and the 124-inch wheelbase Econoline Cargo Van was discontinued after the 1990 model year, leaving the 138-inch wheelbase as the sole option.

In 1982, to increase the fuel economy of the Econoline without a major loss in engine output, Ford introduced the option of a 6.9 L IDI diesel V8 produced by International Harvester; in 1988, this was enlarged to 7.3 L. The diesel V8 engines were available only in Econoline 350s (or Club Wagons sold on the same chassis). The cutaway version was available with the larger (5.8 or 7.5 L) gasoline V8s or the diesel V8.

Due to the popularity of automatic transmissions in full-size vans, Ford discontinued all manual transmissions after the 1989 model year. The column-shifted 3-speed departed after 1986, leaving the floor-shifted 4-speed overdrive manual as standard. The four-speed was replaced by a Mazda-sourced 5-speed M5OD for 1988.

Body 
Unlike its predecessors, Ford designed the 1975 Econoline with a "two-box" layout. Similar to the Ford Transit of the time, the configuration moved the engine as far forward as possible and lower in the chassis than in its predecessor; although the hood was nearly twice as long, the hoodline was much lower. A higher degree of parts commonality with the F series made itself known in the bodystyling: the vent windows, taillights, bumpers, and wheels were common items between the two vehicles.

During its sixteen-year production run, the exterior of the Econoline/Club Wagon would remain nearly unaltered. In 1978, the Super Van/Super Wagon was introduced; based on the 138-inch wheelbase, it was a rear body extension allowing for extra cargo room or an extra row of seating (for up to 15 passengers). In 1979, a minor facelift updated the grille design; round headlights were replaced by rectangular units. In 1983, the Ford Blue Oval was added to the grille, replacing the "FORD" lettering on the hood.

Although the 1986 Ford Aerostar minivan would introduce styling far different from the Econoline, the basic styling of the full-size van would heavily influence the Ford Ranger (and its SUV offspring, the Ford Bronco II).

Interior 
Inside, the redesign of the chassis expanded interior room, though the rear of the engine still remained between the front seats; an engine cover still provided access for servicing. Sharing many controls with the F series, the new design also improved interior ergonomics. In three body sizes, the Econoline was produced in a cargo van and passenger van, with the latter produced in three trim levels; base, Custom and Chateau. In addition, the Club Wagon was produced solely as a passenger van. After 1980, this was replaced by F-series nomenclature of XL and XLT. In line with the F-Series, the Econoline/Club Wagon was sold in 100/150/250/350 variants, with the Econoline 100 discontinued in 1983 (Club Wagon chassis variants were not denoted).

Fourth generation (1992–present) 

For the 1992 model year, Ford introduced the fourth generation of the Econoline/Club Wagon. While the third-generation chassis was largely carried over, the body and interior underwent a complete redesign. The vehicle has received several revisions during its production, with the most recent taking place in 2021.

Toward the end of the 1990s, Ford began to phase out the use of the Econoline and Club Wagon nameplates. For 1999, the Club Wagon nameplate was discontinued (in favor of Econoline Wagon). After the 2000 model year, the Econoline was renamed the E-Series, a nomenclature closer to that of Ford's full-size F-Series trucks.

In June 2014, production of E-Series passenger and cargo vans was discontinued as sales of the Ford Transit began in North America. From the 2015 model year onward, the E-Series has remained in production solely in cutaway and stripped chassis configurations.

Chassis specifications 
The fourth-generation shares the VN platform of the third-generation Econoline, introduced in 1975. Sharing many components with F-Series trucks, the E-Series retained the "Twin I-Beam" front suspension used by rear-wheel drive Ford trucks in North America from the 1960s to the early 1990s. The rear suspension was a live rear axle with rear leaf springs.

For the 2008 model year, the chassis underwent its largest revisions of the fourth generation. In an effort to improve handling and safety, larger brakes were added, improved steering, rollover stability control, and a higher GVWR. The twin I-beam layout was retained, making it the second last Ford vehicle to use it.

Powertrain 
At its 1992 launch, the fourth-generation carried over its powertrain line from the third-generation model line (sharing it with the ninth-generation F-Series). A 4.9L inline-six was standard, with a 5.0L V8, a 5.8L V8 offered as options. On 250 or 350-series vans, a 7.5L V8 and 7.3L Navistar diesel V8 were also optional; the diesel became turbocharged in 1993. During 1994, the IDI diesel was replaced by a 7.3L Ford Powerstroke diesel V8 (also sourced from Navistar).

For 1997, the E-Series underwent a revision of its engine lineup, retaining only the 7.3L diesel. Sharing its gasoline engines with the tenth-generation F-Series, a 4.2L V6 replaced the inline-6 and a 6.8L V10 replaced the 7.5L V8. The 5.0L V8 and the 5.8L V8 were replaced by 4.6L and 5.4L V8s, respectively.

For 2003, the 7.3L diesel was replaced by a 6.0L diesel from Navistar. While gaining an intercooler over its predecessor, due to the lack of airflow in the engine compartment (compared to Super Duty trucks), Ford had to detune the E-Series version of the 6.0L V8. For 2004, the 4.2L V6 was dropped and the 4.6L V8 became the standard engine, making the E-Series the first American full-size van with a V8 engine standard.

The 6.0L Power Stroke was offered until 2009 in the Ford Econoline vans (model year 2010), even though Ford Super Duty trucks were upgraded to the 6.4 version in 2007. Diesels were no longer offered after the 2010 model year. For 2009, the E-Series gained flexible-fuel capability with 4.6L and 5.4L engines (allowing them to use E85).

In May 2014, the final 4.6L V8 was produced for the E-Series, with the 5.4L V8 becoming the standard engine for 2015. For 2017, the 6.8L V10 replaced the 5.4L V8 as the standard engine, with a 6.2L V8 becoming the optional engine; along with flex-fuel capability, both engines were offered with options for conversion to CNG or LPG/propane.

For its 2021 model year revision, the E-Series adopts the 7.3L V8 of the Super Duty truck as the only engine option, offered with an option for conversion to CNG or LPG/propane.

Body 
During its production, the body style of the fourth-generation E-Series underwent minor revisions in 1997 and 2003, with a major revision in 2008.

In line with the F-Series, the Econoline/E-Series was sold in 150, 250, and 350 series, denoting ½, ¾, and 1-ton chassis (the Club Wagon was not designated by chassis size).

The body was available in two lengths, with the extended-length version exclusive to the 250 (3/4-ton) and 350-series (1-ton) chassis for both cargo and passenger vans. The cargo van was sold as a two-passenger vehicle, with the passenger van sold in various configurations, including 5, 8, 9, 12, and 15 passengers.

Trim 
During its production, the fourth-generation model line underwent several name changes. As with the previous generation, the Econoline was sold as both a cargo van and as a passenger van (Econoline Wagon) with the Ford Club Wagon sold only as a passenger van. For 1992 the luxury-oriented Chateau trim line of the Club Wagon, dormant since 1989, made a return, slotted above the XLT trim. For 1992, the Club Wagon Chateau was awarded Truck of the Year by Motor Trend. For 2001, the Chateau was dropped, replaced by the E-150 Traveler; due to low sales, it was dropped after a single model year.

Model history

1992–1997 

For the 1992 model year, Ford introduced the fourth-generation of the Econoline/Club Wagon. While the third-generation chassis was largely carried over, the body and interior underwent a complete redesign. In contrast to its GM and Dodge competitors, the two-box body configuration made a return. To optimize the aerodynamics of the van body, the hood was angled slightly downward and the windshield was raked back (though far less than the Aerostar). If specified, all side and rear window glass was flush-mounted to the body, along with wraparound tail lamp lenses; flush-mounted composite headlamps were an option (standard on all Club Wagons). For 1992, the Econoline/Club Wagon became the first full-size vans produced with a center-mounted brake light.

When redesigning the interior, the driver compartment underwent extensive modernization. While space between the front seats was again dominated by the front-mounted engine, a redesign of the engine cover freed up additional passenger room. Sharing controls and components with the F-Series and Aerostar, the model line became the first full-size van equipped with a standard driver-side airbag (except for 350-series models, exempted by their GVWR). The instrument panel received more legible instruments (but no tachometer); a 6-digit LCD odometer replaced the previous 5-digit analog unit.

For 1994, CFC-free R134a air-conditioning refrigerant was adopted beginning with September 1993 production. For 1995, the tail lamps were revised, removing the amber turn signals.

For the 1996 model year, Ford introduced a new Class 4 medium duty variant of the E-Series, offered exclusively as either a cutaway van chassis or cab chassis. Dubbed the E-Super Duty (in line with the F-Super Duty sold at the same time), this version was created using heavier duty materials than the existing E-350 commercial models, such as a Dana 80 rear axle with higher 4.63 axle ratios, new parking brake assembly, and heavier duty shocks to allow for a max GVWR of 16,000 lbs. It was offered with either the existing 7.3L diesel or 7.5L gas V8s, the latter eventually being replaced by the 6.8L Triton V10. It was sold in either a 158" or 176" wheelbase. Due to its shorter front nose and tighter turning circle compared to the equivalent F-Series model, the E-Super Duty was a popular choice for box truck and bus conversions.

1997–2002 

For 1997, the E-series underwent a revision of both its exterior and interior, largely to bring its appearance in line with other Ford trucks. The previous egg-crate grille was replaced by an eight-hole oval-shaped cutout (matching the Explorer and F-150). For 1999, in line with the newly introduced Super Duty models, the E-Super Duty would be renamed to the E-450.

The interior underwent a complete redesign, adopting an all-new dashboard. Following the adoption of dual airbags (for all versions), the "brick"-style steering wheel was replaced by one with a center-mounted horn. To improve the convenience of interior controls, rotary switches for climate controls were introduced, along with a double-DIN radio. The instrument panel was redesigned, reintroducing an analog odometer. The front seats underwent a redesign, relocating the seatbelt mounting to the B-pillars.

Ford E-550 Super Duty (2002–2003) 

For 2002, Ford introduced the E-550 Super Duty as the highest-GVWR version of the E-Series. Offered solely in a cutaway-cab design, the E-550 was intended to bridge the gap between the pickup truck-derived F-450/550 Super Duty and the F-650 medium-duty trucks.

Sharing a number of chassis components with the F-550 Super Duty, the E-550 was distinguished by a grille styled in line with Super Duty pickup trucks (with a three horizontal slots between two vertical openings). To accommodate the wider, heavier-duty front axle, the van body was fitted with a larger front bumper and plastic fender flares (shared with the F-550 truck). Several wheelbases were offered, ranging between 159.5 inches and 233.5 inches; as with the Super Duty and the E-350/450, the E-550 was powered by either a 6.8L V10 or a 7.3L V8 turbodiesel.

Following the 2003 model year, Ford ended production of the E-550.

2003–2007 

For 2003, the E-series underwent an exterior update, adopting the grille introduced by the 2002 E-550 Super Duty. The new grille shifted the Ford Blue Oval emblem from the hood to the center of the grille (for the first time since 1991); based on trim, the grille was either dark gray or chrome. The front turn signal lenses were changed from clear to amber (their first change since 1992).

Coinciding with the exterior revision, the interior saw several updates. While the dashboard remained essentially unchanged, the engine cover was redesigned (including redesigned cup holders); the design now included a center-mounted glovebox (absent from the E-Series since 1974). For 2004, the instrument cluster was updated with a digital odometer; heavy-duty vans now offered a tachometer (as an option).

2008–2014 

In 2008, the E-Series received a restyled front end design similar to that of the newly introduced Ford Super Duty lineup of trucks. The interior design from the older model E-Series was still used for the 2008 model year.

For the 2009 model year, Ford introduced a new interior for the E-Series. The instrument panel was now larger and included an enhanced message center that could display warning messages, and other information, and the front interior door panels were redesigned with 'E SERIES' branding embossed into the panels. Radios were also revised, with an auxiliary audio input jack being offered as standard equipment on all radios for the first time. The Ford Sync entertainment system, designed by Microsoft, and adding USB integration and hands-free Bluetooth calling and wireless audio streaming capabilities was now also offered as an option. Finally, an optional touchscreen GPS navigation system radio was also offered, and included HD Radio on select models.

Starting with the 2011 model year, the 6.0L Power Stroke turbo-diesel V8 engine was discontinued, and the E Series was no longer offered with a diesel engine.

2015–2020 

For the 2015 model year, Ford discontinued sales of the E-Series passenger and cargo vans, replacing them with the fourth-generation Ford Transit.

Because of its popularity with upfitters who convert the chassis into recreational vehicles, buses, or other specialized vehicles, Ford announced it would continue to offer the E-Series as a cutaway chassis (open cab, to be fitted with second-party rear body), a chassis cab (enclosed cab, to be fitted with second-party rear body) and a stripped chassis (no cab, to be fitted with a complete second-party body).

Ford said it made the change, because while the E-Series had remained the best-selling vehicle in the full-size van segment since 1980, the model line had seen little change since 1992 on a chassis introduced for the 1975 model year. At the time of its 2008 update, 95% of sales were to commercial or fleet users, with nearly half of production represented by cargo vans. Sold outside of North America since 1965, the Transit was introduced to the United States and Canada, offering increased fuel economy and additional body configurations over the E-Series.

Production of the base 4.6L V8 Ford Modular engine was discontinued after the 2015 model year (at the time the E-Series was the last Ford product to use that engine). For the 2016 model year, the only engine option was the 6.8L V10 Triton engine. Starting in 2017, Ford began offering the 6.2L V8 Boss engine.

The chassis cab configuration was eliminated starting with the 2019 model year. Ford did not produce the E-Series for the 2020 model year.

2021–present 

For the 2021 model year, the E-Series interior underwent a redesign, adopting a more modern electronic instrument cluster with steering wheel controls first developed for the Ford Super Duty trucks. Under the hood, all models use the larger 7.3L V8 Godzilla naturally-aspirated gasoline engine also used on Super Duty trucks. However, the exterior design remains unchanged from the 2008 redesign.

The instrument cluster now has a  monochromatic screen with an available upgrade to an  color screen. The new instrument panel also allowed for the addition of new optional safety equipment that was previously not available on the E-Series, including adaptive cruise control, a forward collision avoidance system, a lane departure warning system and automatic high-beam front headlamps.

Meanwhile, the touchscreen Ford Sync infotainment system was eliminated. The only available factory audio system is a basic single DIN model with AM/FM radio, Bluetooth for hands-free calling and wireless stereo audio streaming, and a USB input.

Production and sales

Platforms 
The Ford VN platform is the Ford Motor Company code designation for vans designed in North America. The platform architecture was introduced in 1974, when Ford introduced the third generation of the Econoline full-size van. In the 1980s, the nomenclature was used separately for the Ford Aerostar mid-size van, which is mechanically unrelated to the Econoline/Club Wagon/E-Series. Since 2014, the architecture has no longer been used for mass-produced passenger vehicles, with all examples now produced as chassis cabs or bare chassis.

Both the VN and VN1 chassis utilize rear-wheel drive layouts with longitudinally-mounted engines.

VN58/VN127
Introduced in 1974, Ford introduced the third-generation Econoline, the first produced with a full-length frame. For 1992, the fourth-generation Econoline/Club Wagon/E-Series was introduced, marking a substantial revision to the chassis architecture and a completely new body. For 1997, Ford replaced the entire gasoline powertrain range, shifting from overhead-valve engines to overhead-cam engines.

Following the introduction of the V363N Ford Transit, the VN E-Series ended production as a cargo/passenger van after the 2014 model year. From the 2015 model year onward, the E-Series has remained in production as a cutaway-cab chassis (no bodywork aft of the front doors) and as a stripped chassis (with no bodywork).

This is the final chassis that uses the Ford "Twin I-Beam" front suspension architecture.

Vehicles using this platform include:

 Ford Econoline/Club Wagon/E-Series — full size vans (VN58, about 1989; VN127 1995)
 Ford Carousel — cancelled mid-size van based on SWB Econoline (planned for 1975–1976)

VN1
The VN1 platform is a platform that was developed by Ford for use for mid-size vans, specifically the Ford Aerostar. The first Ford vehicle to use an alphanumeric platform designation, the VN1 platform architecture is mechanically unrelated to the E-Series van, sharing only its rear-wheel-drive layout.

While using a dedicated chassis, the Aerostar was designed with a high degree of parts commonality with other Ford light-truck products of the time (initially, the Ford Ranger/Bronco II and the later Ford Explorer/Mazda Navajo), sharing major components including the brakes, front suspension, wheels, and powertrain. One notable exception is the rear suspension layout; the coil-sprung live rear axle uses a 3-link configuration, similar to the Ford LTD Crown Victoria and Fox-body Mustang.

In contrast to the E-Series van, the unibody chassis of the Aerostar was designed with additional full-length frame rails; this construction was also used on the Chevrolet Astro/GMC Safari vans, the Jeep Cherokee XJ, and the Honda Ridgeline pickup truck.

Vehicles using this platform include:

Ford Aerostar—mid-size van (1986-1997), code named VN1.

See also
 Ford VN platform

References

External links

 Ford E-Series official websites: U.S. | Canada
 Ford E-Series Ambulance Packages official websites (U.S.): Van | Cutaway Chassis
 Vintage Truck Magazine 1962 Ford Econoline Van detailed article
 Ford Vans E series 
 Mark's Econoline Page (Mainly about the 1961–1967 Econoline Pickups)
 Debut: 2008 Ford E-Series Vans (TheMustangNews.com – March 2007)
Econoline.org - for first-generation Econolines from 1961-1967
 1968–74 Ford Van Site
 Ford Econoline in television and film
 camperize.com—info about converting the E series into a campervan
 ThorMotorCoach.com—Major converter of E-series chassis into motorhomes

1960s cars
1970s cars
1980s cars
1990s cars
2000s cars
2010s cars
Cars introduced in 1961
Cab over vehicles
Class 3 trucks
Class 4 trucks
E series
Mid-engined vehicles
Motor vehicles manufactured in the United States
Rear-wheel-drive vehicles
School bus chassis
Vans
Minibuses